Altındağ is a proposed underground station on the Halkapınar—Otogar Line of the İzmir Metro. It will be located beneath Kamil Tunca Avenue in the southern Bornova. Construction of the station, along with the metro line, is scheduled to begin in 2018.

Altındağ station is expected to open in 2020.

References

İzmir Metro
Bornova District
Proposed rapid transit stations in Turkey